Bhong Mosque is a mosque located in the village of Bhong, Rahim Yar Khan District, Punjab Province, Pakistan.

History
It was designed and constructed over a period of nearly 50 years (from 1932 to 1982) and won the Aga Khan Award for Architecture in 1986.

See also
 Aga Khan Award for Architecture
 Islam in Pakistan
 Religious architecture

References

External links

 Aga Khan Award for Architecture - Third Award Cycle, 1984-1986

Mosques completed in 1982
Mosques in Punjab, Pakistan
Tourist attractions in Rahim Yar Khan
1982 establishments in Pakistan